The 34th Legislative Assembly of Ontario was in session from September 10, 1987, until July 30, 1990, just prior to the 1990 general election. The majority party was the Ontario Liberal Party led by David Peterson.

Hugh Edighoffer served as speaker for the assembly.

Notes

References 
Members in Parliament 34

Terms of the Legislative Assembly of Ontario
1987 establishments in Ontario
1990 disestablishments in Ontario